Savatiya (also Kotlas South, Savati, or Savvatiya)  is an former Russian Air Force air base in Arkhangelsk Oblast, Russia located 29 km south of Kotlas.  It is a small interceptor airfield.  It was home to 445th Interceptor Aviation Regiment (445 IAP) between 1967 and 1993, which received Tupolev Tu-128 (ASCC: Fiddler) aircraft in 1967, Mikoyan-Gurevich MiG-25 (ASCC: Foxbat) aircraft by the late 1970s, and Mikoyan MiG-31 (ASCC: Foxhound) by the 1990s. It is also listed as being home to 458th Interceptor Aviation Regiment (458 IAP) which flew MiG-31s in the 1990s.

The base was also used by the 470th Guards Fighter Aviation Regiment from 1993.

References

Russian Air Force bases
Soviet Air Force bases
Soviet Air Defence Force bases
Buildings and structures in Arkhangelsk Oblast